Patrizio Prata (born 2 February 1972 in Milan) is an Italian voice actor and dubbing director who contributes to voicing characters in movies, cartoons, anime, video games and more content.

Prata is well known for voicing characters in animated content such as Android #17 in Dragon Ball Z, Roronoa Zoro in One Piece, Kabuto Yakushi in Naruto and Naruto: Shippuden, Jaden Yuki in Yu-Gi-Oh! GX and other famous animated titles to date. He also provides the voice of Geronimo Stilton in the Geronimo Stilton animated series.

Prata currently works at Studio P.V., Deneb Film, Merak Film and other dubbing studios in Italy. Since February 2007, he is also the current voice-over host for Disney Channel Italy.

Voice work

Cartoons and anime
 Navarre in Fire Emblem Anime
 Dante Vale in Huntik: Secrets & Seekers
 Geronimo Stilton in Geronimo Stilton
 Weevil Underwood, Mahad, and Marik Ishtar in Yu-Gi-Oh!
 Jaden Yuki in Yu-Gi-Oh! GX
 Jack Atlas in Yu-Gi-Oh! 5D's
 Neestro in Yu-Gi-Oh! Zexal        
 Guts in Berserk
 Roronoa Zoro and Jigoro in One Piece
 Roronoa Zoro in One Piece: The Movie
 Roronoa Zoro in Clockwork Island Adventure
 Roronoa Zoro in Chopper's Kingdom on the Island of Strange Animals 
 Roronoa Zoro in One Piece The Movie: Dead End no Bōken
 Roronoa Zoro in One Piece: Norowareta Seiken
 Roronoa Zoro in Baron Omatsuri and the Secret Island
 Roronoa Zoro in Giant Mecha Soldier of Karakuri Castle 
 Tracey Sketchit in Pokémon
 Tracey Sketchit in Pokémon Chronicles
 Tracey Sketchit in Pokémon: The Movie 2000
 Jack Walker in Pokémon Ranger and the Temple of the Sea
 Marcus in Pokémon: Arceus and the Jewel of Life
 Keiichi Morisato in Ah! My Goddess: The Movie
 Keroro in Keroro Gunso
 Seiya Uzaki in Nurse Angel Ririka SOS
 Ogron in Winx Club
 Butch Pakovski in The Adventures of Jimmy Neutron: Boy Genius
 Kabuto Yakushi in Naruto 
 Kabuto Yakushi in Naruto: Shippuden
 Benkei Hanawa in Beyblade: Metal Fusion
 Matt Olsen and Jeek in W.I.T.C.H.
 Conrad L. Lawrence in Blue Dragon
 Max Steel / Josh McGrath in Max Steel
 Superman in Justice League 
 Superman in Justice League Unlimited 
 Jean Havoc in Fullmetal Alchemist 
 Jean Havoc in Fullmetal Alchemist: Brotherhood
 Blue Knight (2nd voice) in Tokyo Mew Mew
 Cedric in Butt-Ugly Martians
 Ed in Ozie Boo!
 Emiliodon in La cueva de Emiliodón
 Marius in Les Misérables: Shōjo Cosette
 Underdog in Underdog
 Doc Samson in The Incredible Hulk
 Chris Carter in Creepy Crawlers
 Yukito Tsukishiro/Yue in Cardcaptor Sakura
 Cyclops in X-Men: Evolution
 Spirou in Spirou et Fantasio
 Himura Kenshin in Rurouni Kenshin
 Tao Ren in Shaman King
 Oxnard in Hamtaro
 Tarō Mitsuki in Mermaid Melody Pichi Pichi Pitch
 Yūhi Aogiri in Ceres, Celestial Legend
 Hiroya Aikawa in Fancy Lala
 Yuri Killian in Kaleido Star
 Goten (older) and Android #17 in Dragon Ball Z
 Akira Sendoh in Slam Dunk
 Abel Nightroad in Trinity Blood
 Kaname Kuran in Vampire Knight
 Ginta Suou in Marmalade Boy
 Terry Bogard in Fatal Fury: The Motion Picture 
 Terry Bogard in Fatal Fury 2: The New Battle 
 Eric Staufer in Scooby-Doo and the Cyber Chase
 Daniel Illiwara in Scooby-Doo! and the Legend of the Vampire
 Alejo Otero in Scooby-Doo! and the Monster of Mexico
 Nenji Nagihara in Nanaka 6/17
 Arnold Jackson (Season 1 only) and David in Totally Spies!
 Kaname Kuran in Vampire Knight
 Don Quixote in Donkey Xote
 Orphen in Sorcerous Stabber Orphen
 Tyco in Angel's Friends
 Hiroshi Daimon in Nazca
 Byakuya Kuchiki in Bleach: Memories of Nobody
 Luke Valentine in Hellsing Ultimate and Hellsing TV series
 David Schwimmer, Ice Cube, Jimi Hendrix, Leonardo DiCaprio, Prince, and Tom Cruise in Celebrity Deathmatch
 Goh Saruwatari in Godannar
 Shining Armor in My Little Pony: Friendship Is Magic

Live action
 Jérôme Couturier (2nd voice) and Joël in Premiers Baisers
 Andre Forester in Watch Over Me
 Goodwin Stanhope in Lost
 Len in Kamen Rider: Dragon Knight
 Adam Park in Mighty Morphin Power Rangers
 Adam Park in Mighty Morphin Power Rangers: The Movie
 Adam Park in Power Rangers Zeo
 Adam Park in Power Rangers Turbo
 Adam Park in Turbo: A Power Rangers Movie
 Robert "R.J." James in Power Rangers Jungle Fury
 Geoffrey Tennant in Slings and Arrows
 Jack Ryan in The Big Bounce
 Tobey in Teeth
 Roger Lloyd in The Skulls III
 Jason Wahler in Laguna Beach: The Real Orange County

Video games
 Kevin Bletchley and Cedric Diggory in Harry Potter: Quidditch World Cup
 Stronghold: Crusader
 Silver
 Ron 'Pointer' Hertz in Chrome
 Call of Duty: Finest Hour
 Santa Claus and Tom Goodman in No One Lives Forever 2: A Spy in H.A.R.M.'s Way
 Alex Balder in Max Payne
 Jack Morton in Covert Ops: Nuclear Dawn
 Tatsumaru and Kimaira in Tenchu: Wrath of Heaven
 Willy and Mariola in Runaway: A Road Adventure

Work as dubbing director
 I Hate My 30's
 Yukikaze
 Friday: The Animated Series
 Jewelpet
 Prétear
 The Truth Below 
 Worst. Prom. Ever.

References

External links
 

1972 births
Living people
Male actors from Milan
Italian male voice actors
Italian male video game actors
Italian voice directors